Turboamerica is the fourth album of Italian band Catarrhal Noise.

Track listing
"Turboamerica" – 2:02 
"Rubrica de l'agricoltore agricolo" – 5:07 
"Me so' caga' dosso" – 2:40
"Silvanos Prestige" – 2:48
"Maedetta chea volta" – 2:53 
"Duilio Sio Gan" – 2:37 
"Fasso macello" – 3:34 
"DJ Beggiato e Renato" – 0:31 
"I boari xe rivai" – 2:53 
"Mansueta" – 1:02 
"A grilliata" – 1:54 
"Figaro Automotors" – 0:54 
"Gianni furgone mojto" – 2:36 
"Giffo Hot Line" – 1:25 
"Bordeo" – 3:17 
"DJ Renato e Beggiato" – 0:28
"Bele ghiape" – 1:52 
"Le bele giornate" – 3:11 
"Sette Racing" – 2:36 
"El toro" – 1:24 
"Renato e Beggiato DJ" – 0:26 
"Bauco" – 3:58 
"A fagiolata" – 2:49
"I Proverbi de Silvano" – 1:37

2002 albums
Catarrhal Noise albums